S. S. Omane (died 11 September 2014) was a Ghanaian police officer and was the Inspector General of Police of the Ghana Police Service from 9 March 1984 to 12 June 1986.

References

Ghanaian police officers
Ghanaian Inspector Generals of Police
2014 deaths